The Italy women's national rugby league team represents Italy in rugby league football. Their governing body, the Federazione Italiana Rugby League, was formed in 2008. They are currently ranked 8th in the RLIF World Rankings.

Roster
Squad for the 2022 International Test against , held on Saturday, 11 June in Udine. Tallies in the table include the match against Ireland.

Results

2022 Rugby League Women's European Championship B 

Upcoming Fixtures:
 During 2023 and 2024 Italy are drawn to play the following three teams in Group B of the European Qualifiers for the 2025 Women's Rugby League  World Cup. Dates and hosts have been selected but the venues are yet to be announced.
  on 2 Sep 2023 in Italy
  on 11 May 2024 in Ireland
  on 25 May 2024 in Italy

See also

 Rugby league in Italy
 Italy national rugby league team

References

External links

Women's national rugby league teams